Islamic Summit of the Organisation of Islamic Cooperation is one of the five highest decision-making bodies of the OIC others four being OIC Council of Foreign Ministers, Standing Committees, Executive Committee, and the International Islamic Court of Justice. The Islamic Summit is a principle organ of the OIC focused on formulation, development, and implementation of decisions made by 57 member states. The Summit is attended by the concerned heads of state such as prime ministers, presidents, emirs and other equivalent heads.

The Summit is held once after every three years incorporated with achieving goals under the framework of OIC'S charter. They formulate policies and adopt resolution at the end of summit. Likewise the OIC Council of Foreign Ministers sessions, an Islamic summit is alternatively hosted by the concerned governments on geographical groups such as Arab, Asia and Africa. As of 2022, a total number of 14 Islamic Summits and 7 Extraordinary Summits have been hosted in various countries across the three continents.

Voting 
Likewise the United Nations General Assembly, each Islamic summit participant table their resolution on a specific matter which is decidedly adopted or declined by the member states under the voting system. Summits are literally considered declaration based on the common feeling of participants. Secretary General of the Organisation of Islamic Cooperation plays a significant role in declaration implementation.

Role of Turkey 
Turkey represents the OIC as a host and permanent member and has hosted one Islamic summit and two extraordinary summits, including 13th Islamic summit between 14 and 15 April 2016 titled Unity and Solidarity for Justice concerning the Israeli–Palestinian conflict. It has also hosted 6th on 13 December 2017 and 7th extraordinary summit on 18 May 2018 regarding the Israeli role in Palestine.

List of summits 
Islamic summit is based on three principles; Final Communique, Resolution, and Declaration. The first summit was attended by the nations in September 1969 in Rabat, Morocco, while the last and the 15th summit was held on 23 March 2022 in Islamabad, Pakistan.

References 

Organisation of Islamic Cooperation
Intergovernmental organizations
Organizations established in 1968